Happy to You is the second studio album by Swedish indie pop band Miike Snow. It was released in the United States on 13 March 2012 by Downtown Records and Universal Republic Records, and in the United Kingdom on 19 March 2012 by Columbia Records.

Background and recording
Miike Snow announced on social media on 31 May 2011 that they were working on a new album. On 6 October 2011, the band began mixing the album. After recording for the album concluded on 29 November 2011, the band started filming the accompanying music videos and finished working on the artwork. The album was named after an "old mis-spelt phrase" on a Thailand postcard that the band put up in the studio. Band member Christian Karlsson said it has "nothing to do with any of the songs... but it sort of stuck".

Release and promotion
The promotional single "Devil's Work" debuted on Zane Lowe's BBC Radio 1 on 6 December 2011, and was subsequently offered as a free download. The band announced on 20 December 2011 that their second studio album would be titled Happy to You, with a release date set for the week of 26 March 2012.

The album's lead single "Paddling Out" premiered on Spin magazine's website on 19 January 2012, before its digital release on 23 January. Another song from the album, "Black Tin Box" (a collaboration with Swedish singer Lykke Li), premiered on Pitchfork on 24 January 2012. Happy to You was released on iTunes on 13 March 2012, 13 days ahead of the original 26 March release date.

"The Wave" was released as the album's second single on 14 May 2012. The accompanying video premiered on 15 March and was once again directed by Swedish director Andreas Nilsson, who also worked on the video for "Paddling Out". Both videos form together a unified story about a group of unfortunate humans who were abducted to space in an experiment to create a perfect human named Jean Noel. After some pretty brutal chainsaw surgery that is performed on the latest abductee, the spaceship seemingly manned by Rococo-era twins crashes to Earth and that is where the story of the second video starts.

Commercial reception
In the United States, Happy to You debuted at number 43 on the Billboard 200, selling 10,000 copies its first week. It also debuted at number 13 on the Billboards Rock Albums chart and at number nine on the Alternative Albums chart. As of January 2016, the album had sold 42,000 copies in the US.

Track listing

Personnel
Credits adapted from the liner notes of Happy to You.

 Miike Snow – all instruments, arrangements, production, programming, recording, vocals
 Johan Ahlin – French horn 
 Gustav Ejstes – Autoharp 
 Staffan Findin – bass trombone, trombone 
 Niklas Flyckt – mixing
 Svante Halldin – flugelhorn, trumpet 
 Thomas Hedlund – drums 
 Ted Jensen – mastering
 Lykke Li – additional vocals 
 David Lindberg – field drums 
 Pär Lindqvist – strings 
 Jonathan Lundberg – field drums 
 Samuel Lundin – mastering assistance
 Claes Malmberg – field drums 
 Natalie Migdal – strings 
 Sabina Sandri Olsson – strings 
 Nille Perned – additional recording
 Axel Sjöstedt – trumpet 
 Fredrik Syberg – strings 
 Nils Törnqvist – drums

Charts

References

2012 albums
Columbia Records albums
Downtown Records albums
Miike Snow albums
Universal Republic Records albums